Abd Allah ibn Rawahah ibn Tha'laba, was one of the companions of the Islamic prophet Muhammad who was martyred in the Battle of Mu'tah.

Biography
Ibn Rawaha was from the Arabian tribe of Banu Khazraj. At a time when writing was not a common skill, he was a scribe and a poet.

He was one of the twelve representatives of the Ansar who took an oath of allegiance before the Hijrah, and later spread Islam to Medina. Also he was among the 73 that pledged allegiance to Muhammad in Medina.
He is said to have been alert to the supposed plots of Abd-Allah ibn Ubayy.

Military expeditions and death 
Abdullah ibn Rawaha was third in command during the Battle of Mu'tah and was subsequently martyred during the battle. He also led his own expedition known as the Expedition of Abdullah ibn Rawaha, where he was sent to assassinate Al-Yusayr ibn Rizam.

See also
Sunni view of the Sahaba

References

Companions of the Prophet
Year of birth unknown
629 deaths
Medieval Arabs killed in battle
Khazrajite people